HD 142022 is a binary star system located in the southernmost constellation of Octans. It is too faint to be visible to the naked eye, having an apparent visual magnitude of 7.70. The distance to this system is 112 light years based on parallax, but it is drifting closer to the Sun with a radial velocity of −9.6 km/s.

The primary, designated component A, is an old, Population I G-type star with a stellar classification of G9IV-V, showing a spectrum with mixed traits of a main sequence and a subgiant star. It is an estimated 7.6 billion years old and is spinning with a projected rotational velocity of 2 km/s. The star has similar mass and dimensions as the Sun, but has a 55% higher metallicity. It is radiating 89% of the luminosity of the Sun from its photosphere at an effective temperature of 5516 K.

The magnitude 11.19 companion has the designation LTT 6384 and appears gravitationally bound to the primary. The secondary is a red dwarf star with a stellar classification of M1V.

The primary star has a single known planetary companion, discovered in 2005.

See also 
 HD 141937
 HD 142415
 List of extrasolar planets

References

G-type main-sequence stars
M-type main-sequence stars
Planetary systems with one confirmed planet
Binary stars
Octans
Durchmusterung objects
Gliese and GJ objects
142022
079242